Fabio Eduardo "La Mole" Moli (born May 23, 1969 in Villa del Rosario, Córdoba) is an Argentine former boxer and Heavyweight champion of Argentina.

Career
Throughout his career he has won nine titles so far. On August 30, 2003 was challenging for the title of World Boxing Association champion against Ukrainian Wladimir Klitschko, but lost by knockout in the first assault.
On November 14, 2010 again won the Argentine championship in the Orfeo Superdomo in Córdoba against Lisandro "El Carnicero" Diaz by TKO in the fifth round.

Outside the boxing world, on December 16, 2010 with nearly 70% of the vote reached the final of Bailando 2010 (Argentinian version of Dancing with the Stars), a tournament that he won with 50.24% of the vote, against Argentine model Paula Chaves. He made his theatrical debut in December 2010 with the play El Gran Show at the theater Coral of Villa Carlos Paz. On 2011 he participated in the seventh season of Bailando por un Sueño, but this time, he was eliminated in the 24th place by last years runner-up Paula Chaves.

Professional titles
South American Heavyweight
FAB
World Boxing Association Fedelatin
World Boxing Organization Latino
World Boxing Council Hispanic world

Professional boxing record

|-
|align="center" colspan=8|44 Wins (29 knockouts, 15 decisions), 9 Losses (6 knockouts, 2 decisions), 2 No Contests 
|-
| align="center" style="border-style: none none solid solid; background: #e3e3e3"|Result
| align="center" style="border-style: none none solid solid; background: #e3e3e3"|Record
| align="center" style="border-style: none none solid solid; background: #e3e3e3"|Opponent
| align="center" style="border-style: none none solid solid; background: #e3e3e3"|Type
| align="center" style="border-style: none none solid solid; background: #e3e3e3"|Round
| align="center" style="border-style: none none solid solid; background: #e3e3e3"|Date
| align="center" style="border-style: none none solid solid; background: #e3e3e3"|Location
| align="center" style="border-style: none none solid solid; background: #e3e3e3"|Notes
|-align=center
|Loss
|
|align=left| Matías Vidondo
|DQ
|5
|30/08/2013
|align=left| Club Atlético Talleres, Remedios de Escalada, Buenos Aires
|align=left|
|-
|Win
|
|align=left| Emilio Ezequiel Zarate
|KO
|8
|08/06/2012
|align=left| Polideportivo Delmi, Salta
|align=left|
|-
|Win
|
|align=left| Sebastian Ignacio Ceballos
|UD
|10
|16/12/2011
|align=left| Club Defensores de Villa Lujan, San Miguel de Tucuman
|align=left|
|-
|Win
|
|align=left| Lisandro Ezequiel Diaz
|TKO
|5
|14/11/2010
|align=left| Orfeo Superdomo, Cordoba, Argentina
|align=left|
|-
|Win
|
|align=left| Emilio Ezequiel Zarate
|KO
|3
|14/05/2010
|align=left| Club Atletico Penarol, Pilar, Buenos Aires Province
|align=left|
|-
|Win
|
|align=left| Cesar Gustavo Acevedo
|TKO
|2
|27/11/2009
|align=left| Club El Ceibo, San Francisco, Cordoba
|align=left|
|-
|Loss
|
|align=left| Lisandro Ezequiel Diaz
|TKO
|4
|15/05/2009
|align=left| Sociedad de Bomberos Voluntarios, San Francisco, Cordoba
|align=left|
|-
|Win
|
|align=left| Mauro Adrian Ordiales
|RTD
|4
|13/12/2008
|align=left| Polideportivo Vicente Polimeni, Las Heras, Mendoza
|align=left|
|-
|Win
|
|align=left| Manuel Alberto Pucheta
|DQ
|1
|11/07/2008
|align=left| Club Defensores de Villa Lujan, San Miguel de Tucuman
|align=left|
|-
|Win
|
|align=left| Hector Ricardo Sotelo
|KO
|2
|16/02/2008
|align=left| Estadio Ave Fenix, San Luis, Argentina
|align=left|
|-
|Win
|
|align=left| Lisandro Ezequiel Diaz
|TKO
|5
|14/12/2007
|align=left| Polideportivo Municipal Carlos Cerutti, Cordoba, Argentina
|align=left|
|-
|Win
|
|align=left| Luis Oscar Ricail
|KO
|2
|19/10/2007
|align=left| Polideportivo Municipal Carlos Cerutti, Cordoba, Argentina
|align=left|
|-
|Loss
|
|align=left| Marcelo Fabian Dominguez
|TKO
|6
|02/12/2006
|align=left| Estadio Diego Armando Maradona, Buenos Aires
|align=left|
|-
|Win
|
|align=left| Marcos Celestino
|KO
|2
|08/09/2006
|align=left| Club Estudiantes, Hernando, Cordoba
|align=left|
|-
|Loss
|
|align=left| Taras Bydenko
|TKO
|6
|12/05/2006
|align=left| Orfeo Superdomo, Cordoba, Argentina
|align=left|
|-
|Win
|
|align=left| Carlos Javier Ojeda Roldan
|KO
|5
|06/01/2006
|align=left| Anfiteatro Municipal, Rio Cuarto, Cordoba
|align=left|
|-
|Loss
|
|align=left| Marcelo Fabian Dominguez
|RTD
|7
|12/08/2005
|align=left| Orfeo Superdomo, Cordoba, Argentina
|align=left|
|-
|Loss
|
|align=left| Matt Skelton
|TKO
|6
|25/02/2005
|align=left| Wembley Conference Centre, Wembley, London
|align=left|
|-
|Win
|
|align=left| Mariano Ramon Ocampo
|UD
|12
|03/12/2004
|align=left| Orfeo Superdomo, Cordoba, Argentina
|align=left|
|-
|Win
|
|align=left| Manuel Hector Azar
|KO
|2
|08/10/2004
|align=left| Orfeo Superdomo, Cordoba, Argentina
|align=left|
|-
|Win
|
|align=left| Miguel Angel Antonio Aguirre
|TKO
|2
|27/08/2004
|align=left| Polideportivo Carlos Cerutti, Cordoba, Argentina
|align=left|
|-
|Loss
|
|align=left| Wladimir Klitschko
|KO
|1
|30/08/2003
|align=left| Olympiahalle, Munich, Bavaria
|align=left|
|-
|Win
|
|align=left| Alexander Vasiliev
|UD
|10
|13/06/2003
|align=left| Orfeo Superdomo, Cordoba, Argentina
|align=left|
|-
|Win
|
|align=left| Edegar Da Silva
|TKO
|5
|15/02/2003
|align=left| Santa Rosa de Calamuchita, Cordoba
|align=left|
|-
|Loss
|
|align=left| Marcelo Fabian Dominguez
|UD
|12
|19/10/2002
|align=left| Estadio Luna Park, Buenos Aires
|align=left|
|-
|Win
|
|align=left| Pedro Daniel Franco
|UD
|8
|15/03/2002
|align=left| Club Social La Carlota, La Carlota, Argentina
|align=left|
|-
|Win
|
|align=left| Walter Armando Masseroni
|TKO
|2
|25/01/2002
|align=left| La Falda, Cordoba
|align=left|
|-
|Win
|
|align=left| Jorge Alfredo Dascola
|UD
|10
|30/11/2001
|align=left| Club General Paz Juniors, Cordoba, Argentina
|align=left|
|-
|NC
|
|align=left| Walter Armando Masseroni
|NC
|2
|06/10/2000
|align=left| Cordoba, Argentina
|align=left|
|-
|Win
|
|align=left| Tony LaRosa
|TKO
|2
|04/12/1999
|align=left| Estadio Lanus, Lanus, Argentina
|align=left|
|-
|Win
|
|align=left| Jorge Alfredo Dascola
|KO
|2
|17/09/1999
|align=left| Cordoba, Argentina
|align=left|
|-
|Win
|
|align=left| Pedro Daniel Franco
|UD
|12
|11/06/1999
|align=left| Club General Paz Juniors, Cordoba, Argentina
|align=left|
|-
|Win
|
|align=left| Marcus Rhode
|TKO
|3
|23/04/1999
|align=left| San Luis, Argentina
|align=left|
|-
|Win
|
|align=left| Cleveland Woods
|UD
|10
|13/02/1999
|align=left| Cordoba, Argentina
|align=left|
|-
|Win
|
|align=left| Pedro Daniel Franco
|TKO
|8
|11/12/1998
|align=left| Club General Paz Juniors, Cordoba, Argentina
|align=left|
|-
|Win
|
|align=left| Jorge Alfredo Dascola
|TD
|7
|09/10/1998
|align=left| Club General Paz Juniors, Cordoba, Argentina
|align=left|
|-
|Win
|
|align=left| Juan Alberto Barrero
|DQ
|4
|11/09/1998
|align=left| Rio Cuarto, Cordoba
|align=left|
|-
|Win
|
|align=left| Marcos Celestino
|KO
|4
|10/07/1998
|align=left| Bell Ville
|align=left|
|-
|Win
|
|align=left| Luis Nelson Gonzalez
|TKO
|3
|15/05/1998
|align=left| Villa del Rosario, Cordoba
|align=left|
|-
|Win
|
|align=left| Mariano Ramon Ocampo
|KO
|6
|03/04/1998
|align=left| Cordoba, Argentina
|align=left|
|-
|Win
|
|align=left| Daniel Eduardo Neto
|MD
|12
|06/03/1998
|align=left| Rio Tercero, Cordoba
|align=left|
|-
|Win
|
|align=left| Tommy Mucciogrosso
|TKO
|2
|06/02/1998
|align=left| La Falda, Cordoba
|align=left|
|-
|NC
|
|align=left| Ricardo Alfredo Ibarra
|NC
|1
|13/12/1997
|align=left| Cordoba, Argentina
|align=left|
|-
|Win
|
|align=left| Mario Oscar Melo
|UD
|12
|21/11/1997
|align=left| Adelia Maria, Cordoba
|align=left|
|-
|Win
|
|align=left| Miguel Otero Ocasio
|UD
|10
|31/10/1997
|align=left| Villa Maria, Cordoba
|align=left|
|-
|Win
|
|align=left| Eduardo Luiz Dos Santos
|RTD
|6
|27/09/1997
|align=left| Jesus Maria, Cordoba
|align=left|
|-
|Win
|
|align=left| Juraci Dos Santos
|KO
|1
|05/09/1997
|align=left| Rio Tercero, Cordoba
|align=left|
|-
|Win
|
|align=left| Ricardo Alfredo Ibarra
|RTD
|9
|15/08/1997
|align=left| Cordoba, Argentina
|align=left|
|-
|Win
|
|align=left| Carlos Barcelete
|KO
|7
|14/06/1997
|align=left| Cordoba, Argentina
|align=left|
|-
|Loss
|
|align=left| Mariano Ramon Ocampo
|UD
|8
|24/05/1997
|align=left| Estadio F.A.B., Buenos Aires
|align=left|
|-
|Win
|
|align=left| Angel Amarilla Garcia
|KO
|2
|25/04/1997
|align=left| Laborde, Cordoba
|align=left|
|-
|Win
|
|align=left| Alberto Toribio Coman
|KO
|2
|04/04/1997
|align=left| Villa del Rosario, Cordoba
|align=left|
|-
|Win
|
|align=left| Luis Nelson Gonzalez
|TKO
|3
|14/03/1997
|align=left| Cordoba, Argentina
|align=left|
|-
|Win
|
|align=left| Carlos Barcelete
|UD
|6
|14/02/1997
|align=left| Villa Carlos Paz, Cordoba Province
|align=left|
|-
|Win
|
|align=left| Alberto Toribio Coman
|UD
|4
|25/01/1997
|align=left| Villa Carlos Paz, Cordoba Province
|align=left|
|}

References

External links
 

1969 births
Living people
Sportspeople from Córdoba Province, Argentina
Argentine male boxers
Heavyweight boxers
Participants in Argentine reality television series
Bailando por un Sueño (Argentine TV series) participants